Dignano is a comune (municipality) in the Province of Udine in the Italian region Friuli-Venezia Giulia, located about  northwest of Trieste and about  west of Udine.

Dignano borders the following municipalities: Coseano, Flaibano, Rive d'Arcano, San Daniele del Friuli, San Giorgio della Richinvelda, Spilimbergo.

References

External links
 Official website

Cities and towns in Friuli-Venezia Giulia